Oldie Blues was a Dutch record label founded and owned by Martin van Olderen.

History
The label was founded in 1974 and focused primarily on piano blues, boogie-woogie and Delta blues, issuing 46 LPs and 13 CDs. After the death of Martin van Olderen in 2002 the label continued to issue records into 2004. Oldie Blues was marketed and distributed by Munich Records.

Artists
The label's roster included Little Willie Littlefield, Blind John Davis, Lonnie Johnson, Roosevelt Sykes, Big Joe Williams and Dutch musicians Rob Hoeke, Martijn Schok, and Rob Agerbeek.

References

External links
 Oldie Blues discography on Allmusic
 Oldie Blues discography on Discogs
 Oldie Blues discography at Rate Your Music
 Oldie Blues discography at MuziekWeb

Dutch record labels
Record labels established in 1974
Record labels disestablished in 2004